Turki bin Abdulaziz al-Jasser was a Saudi journalist arrested and tortured to death while being held in a Saudi prison. News of his death came only one month after the murder of another Saudi journalist, Jamal Khashoggi. Al-Jasser was running what he thought was an anonymous Twitter account called Kashkol as a "proxy public square" for Saudi citizens to express their opinions, but instead became a forum for army 'trolls' to poison debate, harass dissidents and spread misinformation. In 2018 his identity was revealed by the Twitter office in Dubai.

References 

Assassinated Saudi Arabian journalists
2018 deaths
Saudi Arabian people who died in prison custody
Saudi Arabian Muslims
Year of birth missing